Stigmella aigialeia is a moth of the family Nepticulidae. It is endemic to New Zealand.

Taxonomy 
This species was first described in 1989 by Hans Donner and Christopher Wilkinson from a specimens collected in Auckland, Queen Charlotte Sound and Invercargill. The holotype specimen, collected at Huia Reserve by B. M. May, is held in the New Zealand Arthropod Collection.

Description 
The larvae of this species are pale yellow in colour and are approximately 3mm long.

The wingspan of the adult moth is approximately 4 mm. The moth is grey in appearance with brown grey and then whitish forewings. The forewings have two black spots. The hindwings are grey in colour. It is similar in appearance to the female of S. hoheriae but is much smaller.

Distribution 
S. aigialeia is endemic to New Zealand. This species can be found both in the North and South Islands.

Biology and behaviour 
The larvae of this species mine the leaves of their host plant. The mine consists of a small gallery gradually filling all space between leaf cuticles. Larvae have been recorded in April, May and September. The cocoons are made of brown silk and can be found in the leaf litter on the ground.

Adults have been recorded in January, February, September and October. Probably in one but possibly in two generations per year.

Habitat and host plants 

The larvae feed on Plagianthus divaricatus and can therefore be found in that coastal habitat such as salt marshes and sandbanks favoured by that shrub.

References

Nepticulidae
Moths of New Zealand
Endemic fauna of New Zealand
Moths described in 1989
Endemic moths of New Zealand